The Department of Defence Production of the Ministry of Defence is responsible for the indigenous production of equipment used by the Indian Navy and the other armed forces. It comprises the 41 Indian Ordnance Factories under control of the Ordnance Factories Board and eight Defence PSUs: HAL, BEL, BEML, BDL, MDL, GSL, GRSE and Midhani. The present weapon systems of the Indian Navy are:

Submarine-launched ballistic missiles
 Sagarika  SLBM
 K4 SLBM (deployed on Arihant-class submarine for trials)
 K-5 SLBM (Under development)
 K-6 SLBM (Under development)

Ship launched ballistic missiles
Dhanush

Cruise/anti-ship missiles

BrahMos Hypersonic Cruise Missile (Under development)
BrahMos Supersonic Cruise Missile
 3M-54E/3M-14E Klub Anti-Ship/Land Attack Cruise Missile (SS-N-27 Sizzler)
Kh-35 (SS-N-25 SwitchBlade)
P-20 (SS-N-2D Styx)
Sea Eagle missile
Harpoon (missile)
Exocet missile (Used by )
NASM-SR(Under development)

Air to air missiles
Derby missile
R-73 missile
R-77 missile
Astra

Surface to air missiles

Barak 1 - Being replaced by VL-SRSAM missile.
Barak 8 
SA-N-12 (SA-17 Grizzly)
SA-N-11 (SA-19 Grison)
SA-N-7 (SA-11 Gadfly)
SA-N-5
SA-N-4 (OSA-M)
SA-N-1 (S-125M)
SA-16 (Igla MANPAD)
VL-SRSAM

Torpedoes

Whitehead A244-S anti-submarine torpedo
APR-3E torpedo
CET-65E torpedo
Type 53-65KE torpedo (passive wake homing)
TEST 71/76 anti-submarine, active and passive homing torpedo
AEG-SUT Mod-1 wire-guided, active/passive homing torpedo
DM2A4 Seahake torpedo
Advanced Light Torpedo Shyena
Varunastra
Takshak (under development)

Main guns
A-190(E) 100mm
100mm AK-100 naval gun
AK-176-M 76mm gun
AK-76/62 76mm gun
Twin mount gun (76mm)
OTO Melara Otobreda 76 mm gun
Mk.6 Vickers 114mm gun
Bofors 40mm/57mm/60mm guns
Oerlikon 20 mm cannon (for patrol boats)
CRN-91 30 mm cannon (for patrol boats)

Air defence guns
AK-630 six-barreled 30 mm Gatling gun
AK-230 twin 30 mm gun
CADS-N-1 Kashtan

ASW rocket launchers
RBU-6000
RBU-6000 (RPK-8)
RBU-12000 (UDAV-1)
RBU-1000
GSh-30-1

See also
List of equipment of the Indian Army

References

External links
Mines and rockets
Indian Navy at Bharat-rakshak.com

Indian Navy
Weapons of India